The UT-88 is a DIY educational computer designed in Soviet Union. Its description was published in YT dlya umelykh ruk (Young technical designer for skilled hands) — a supplement to Yunij Technik (Young technical designer) magazine in 1989. It was intended for building by school children of extracurricular hobby groups at Pioneers Palaces.

Description 
At the time of publication there were several DIY computers: Micro-80, Radio-86RK, Specialist. The main feature of UT-88 was the possibility to build a computer in stages while getting a workable construction at each step. This approach made it easier to build by less skilled hobbyists.

The minimal configuration of the computer includes power supply, CPU, 1 KiB of ROM and 1 KiB of RAM, 6 seven-segment displays, 17-key keyboard and a tape interface. This computer can be used as a scientific calculator.

Full configuration adds a display module with a TV interface and a full keyboard, and a 64 KiB dynamic RAM module.

References 

Soviet computer systems